Monika Mühlwerth (born 24 April 1954) is an Austrian politician who is currently a Member of the Federal Council for the Freedom Party of Austria (FPÖ).

References

1954 births
Living people
Members of the Federal Council (Austria)
Freedom Party of Austria politicians
Austrian women in politics